Dmytro Hennadiyovych Plakhtyr (born 14 February 1996) is a Ukrainian amateur football midfielder who currently plays for Motor Zaporizhzhia.

Plakhtyr is a product of FC Metalurh Zaporizhzhia youth team system. His first trainer was Mykola Syenovalov.

He made his debut for Metalurh Zaporizhzhia in the Ukrainian Premier League in a match against FC Dnipro Dnipropetrovsk on 12 September 2015.

References

External links
 
 

1996 births
Living people
Footballers from Zaporizhzhia
Ukrainian footballers
Association football midfielders
FC Metalurh Zaporizhzhia players
FC Oleksandriya players
Ukrainian Premier League players
Ukrainian Second League players